The following is a list of notable deaths in December 1991.

Entries for each day are listed alphabetically by surname. A typical entry lists information in the following sequence:
 Name, age, country of citizenship at birth, subsequent country of citizenship (if applicable), reason for notability, cause of death (if known), and reference.

December 1991

1
Ernst Albrecht, 77, German politician and member of the Bundestag.
Charles D. Breitel, 82, American lawyer and politician.
Karl Chmielewski, 88, German SS officer and concentration camp commandant.
Barbara Hanrahan, 52, Australian artist, printmaker and writer.
Zin Harris, 64, New Zealand cricket player.
Thomas J. Hillery, 87, American politician.
Robert Kerber, 78, American swimmer and Olympian.
Jim Knox, 72, New Zealand trade unionist.
Buster Mills, 83, American baseball player, coach, and scout.
Pat O'Callaghan, 85, Irish Olympic hammer thrower (1928, 1932).
Pyotr Pochynchuk, 37, Soviet and Russian athlete and Olympic medalist.
Alden Sanborn, 92, American rower and Olympic champion.
George Stigler, 80, American economist and Nobel Prize laureate (1982), heart failure.

2
Ernst Achenbach, 82, German politician.
Bimal Mitra, 79, Indian writer.
Tracy D. Terrell, 48, American education theorist, AIDS.
John J. Tolson, 76, United States Army lieutenant general.
Eleanor Tufts, 64, American art historian and academic, ovarian cancer.

3
René Brossy, 85, French cyclist.
Arthur Fischer, 94, Swedish actor, writer, and sculptor.
Jack Laird, 68, American screenwriter, heart disease.
George Lott, 85, American tennis player and coach.
Petre Țuțea, 89, Romanian philosopher, journalist, and economist.

4
Cliff Bastin, 79, English football player.
Moysés Baumstein, 60, Brazilian artist.
Bert T. Combs, 80, American jurist and politician, hypothermia.
Alex Graham, 78, Scottish cartoonist (Fred Basset).
Orestes Jordán, 78, Peruvian international football player.
Eugen Maucher, 79, German politician and member of the Bundestag.
Irving Taylor, 72, Canadian ice hockey player.
Herb Thomas, 89, American baseball player and manager.

5
Earl Evans, 91, American gridiron football player.
Robert Karvelas, 70, American actor (Get Smart).
Aad Mansveld, 47, Dutch footballer, cancer.
Héctor Orezzoli, 38, Argentine stage director and costume-, set-, and lighting designer, cardiopulmonary arrest.
Richard Speck, 49, American convicted mass murderer, heart attack.
Dimitrije Stefanović, 95, Yugoslav Olympic long-distance runner (1928).
Jack Trevor Story, 74, English novelist.
Roy Welensky, 84, Northern Rhodesian politician and Prime Minister.
Hein van der Zee, 62, Dutch boxer and Olympian.

6
Rodney Ackland, 83, English playwright, actor, and screenwriter.
György Aczél, 74, Hungarian communist politician.
Vladimir Colin, 70, Romanian author.
Virgilio Corbo, 73, Italian archaeologist.
Vishnu Madhav Ghatage, 83, Indian aeronautical engineer.
Tsuguhiro Hattori, 71, Japanese baseball player.
Terry Slater, 54, Canadian ice hockey player and coach.
Mimi Smith, 85, British nurse and secretary, aunt and parental guardian of musician John Lennon.
Richard Stone, 78, British economist, Nobel Prize laureate (1984), pneumonia.

7
Judith Hart, 67, British politician, cancer.
Herb Jaffe, 70, American film producer (Fright Night), cancer.
Ataur Rahman Khan, 86, Bangladeshi lawyer, politician and Prime Minister.
Spiro Kostof, 55, American architectural historian, and academic, cancer.
Gordon Pirie, 60, English Olympic runner (1956), cholangiocarcinoma.

8
Francisco de Assis Barbosa, 77, Brazilian essayist, historian, and journalist.
Buck Clayton, 80, American trumpeter.
Attila Laták, 46, Hungarian Olympic wrestler (1972).
Bill Lewis, 75, Australian politician.

9
Berenice Abbott, 93, American photographer.
Olga Bondareva, 54, Soviet mathematician and economist, traffic accident.
Maurice Joyeux, 81, French writer and anarchist.
Greta Kempton, 90, American artist, heart failure.
Gisèle Lestrange, 64, French graphic artist.

10
Mark Faber, 41, English cricket player, complications from surgery.
Tippy Larkin, 74, American boxer, kidney failure.
Franco Maria Malfatti, 64, Italian politician, president of the European Commission (1970–1972).
José María Cabo Puig, 84, Spanish football player and manager.
Jean Rigaux, 82, French songwriter and actor.
Gustav Schäfer, 85, German rower.
György Szűcs, 79, Hungarian football player.

11
Enid Moodie Heddle, 87, Australian poet, editor children's writer.
Kavisena Herath, 75, Ceylonese politician.
Dick Kelley, 51, American baseball player.
Robert Q. Lewis, 70, American television personality (What's My Line?) and actor, pulmonary emphysema.
Artur Lundkvist, 85, Swedish writer.
Matthew Rapf, 71, American television producer (Kojak, Ben Casey, The Loretta Young Show), influenza.
Carmen Rosales, 74, Filipina actress and guerilla fighter during World War II.
Joe Scibelli, 52, American gridiron football player.
Simon Scott, 71, American actor (Trapper John, M.D., McHale's Navy, Cold Turkey), Alzheimer's disease.
Mudiyanse Tennakoon, 57, Sri Lankan politician.
Mario Tobino, 81, Italian poet, writer and psychiatrist.
Pat Walshe, 91, American dwarf actor and circus performer, heart attack.

12
Eleanor Boardman, 93, American actress (The Crowd).
Moshe Castel, 82, Israeli painter.
Joaquim Gomis, 89, Spanish photographer, entrepreneur, and art collector.
Harold St. John, 99, American botanist and academic.
Ken Keltner, 75, American baseball player.
Peter Kienast, 42, Austrian bobsledder and Olympian.
Henk Ngantung, 70, Indonesian painter and politician.
Ronnie Ross, 58, British saxophonist, cancer.
Amherst Villiers, 91, English engineer and painter.

13
Stuart Challender, 44, Australian conductor, AIDS-related complications.
André Pieyre de Mandiargues, 82, French writer.
Jan Hendriks, 63, German film actor.
Judy Moorcroft, 58, British costume designer (A Passage to India, The Europeans, The Killing Fields).
Vincent Saurin, 84, French rower and Olympian.

14
John Arlott, 77, English broadcaster (Test Match Special).
Guillermo Barreto, 62, Cuban drummer and timbalero.
Robert Eddison, 83, English actor (Indiana Jones and the Last Crusade), pneumonia.
Claude Faraggi, 49, French writer.
Nikolay Gusakov, 57, Soviet nordic combined skier and Olympic medalist.

15
Reidar Andersen, 80, Norwegian ski jumper and Olympic medalist.
Grete Mostny, 77, Austrian-Chilean anthropologist, cancer.
Ray Smith, 55, Welsh actor, heart attack.
Sid Youngelman, 60, American gridiron football player.
Vasily Zaytsev, 76, Soviet sniper during World War II and Hero of the Soviet Union.

16
H. C. Casserley, 88, British photographer.
Horatio Luro, 90, American racehorse trainer, pancreatic cancer.
Pier Vittorio Tondelli, 36, Italian writer, AIDS-related complications.
Mohammad Javad Tondguyan, 53, Iranian engineer and politician.
Leopold Vogl, 81, Austrian football player and manager.

17
Mitsuo Aida, 67, Japanese poet, brain hemorrhage.
John Anton Blatnik, 80, American politician, member of the U.S. House of Representatives (1947–1974).
Heinz Brücher, 76, German-Argentine botanist and SS officer during World War II, murdered.
Jim Cunningham, 56, American basketball player.
Jesse Flores, 77, Mexican Major League Baseball player.
Armand Frappier, 87, Canadian physisican.
Chen Wen Hsi, 85, Chinese-Singaporean artist.
Carl Shy, 83, American basketball player.
Joey Smallwood, 90, Canadian politician.
Ronnie Starling, 82, English football player.
Kurt Weyher, 90, German rear admiral of the navy (Kriegsmarine) of Nazi Germany.

18
George Abecassis, 78, British racing driver.
Richard Bruck, 76, American mathematician.
Kerry Fitzgerald, 43, Australian rugby referee.
King Kolax, 79, American jazz trumpeter and bandleader, Alzheimer's disease.
Jean Orcibal, 78, French historian on religion.
Marion L. Starkey, 90, American historian.
June Storey, 73, Canadian-American actress, cancer.

19
Joe Cole, 30, American roadie (Rollins Band, Black Flag), shot.
Howie Dallmar, 69, American basketball player, heart failure.
Ernest K. Gann, 81, American aviator, sailor, and author (Fate Is the Hunter, The High and the Mighty), kidney failure.
Paul Maxwell, 70, Canadian-British actor (Coronation Street, Aliens, A Bridge Too Far).

20
Simone Beck, 87, French cookbook writer.
Walter Chiari, 67, Italian actor, heart attack.
John Brian Harley, 59, English cartographer.
Lal Chand Yamla Jatt, 77, Indian folk singer.
Waldemar Kazanecki, 62, Polish musician.
Maynard C. Krueger, 85, American socialist politician and academic.
Samuel Rabin, 80, English artist and Olympic wrestler (1928).
Albert Van Vlierberghe, 49, Belgian cyclist.
Gaston Waringhien, 90, French linguist.

21
José Miguel Barandiarán, 101, Spanish anthropologist, ethnographer, and catholic priest.
Minna Citron, 95, American painter and printmaker.
Alvin Robert Cornelius, 88, Pakistani jurist, legal philosopher and judge.
Colin Douglas, 79, English actor.
Francesco Golisano, 62, Italian film actor.
Hannes Häyrinen, 77, Finnish actor.
Sheldon Mayer, 74, American comics artist, writer, and editor.
Byron N. Scott, 88, American lawyer and politician.

22
Franz Brunner, 78, Austrian field handball player and Olympian silver medalist.
Joe Carter, 82, American football player.
James C. Fletcher, 72, American academic and NASA administrator.
Ernesto Grassi, 89, Italian philosopher.
Beaver Harris, 55, American jazz drummer.
Mirza Nurul Huda, 72, Bangladesh politician and academic.
Ernst Krenek, 91, Austrian-American composer.
Jack Otterson, 86, American art director.
Bruno Pellizzari, 84, Italian racing cyclist.
Hans Edmund Wolters, 76, German ornithologist.
Édouard Woolley, 75, Haitian-Canadian tenor, actor, and composer.

23
José Guerrero, 77, Spanish artist.
Gene Milford, 89, American film and television editor.
Andrew Odom, 55, American blues musician, heart attack.
Bořivoj Zeman, 79, Czech film director and screenwriter.

24
Jimmy Crapnell, 88, Scottish footballer.
El-Sayed El-Dhizui, 65, Egyptian football player.
Alfons Goppel, 86, German politician and Prime Minister of Bavaria.
Marion West Higgins, 76, American politician, traffic collision.
Ghulam Rasul, 60, Pakistani educationist  and field hockey Olympic champion.
Virginia Sorensen, 79, American writer.

25
Curt Bois, 90, German actor.
Anton Burger, 80, German SS officer and concentration camp commandant.
Orane Demazis, 97, French actress.
Frank Finnigan, 88, Canadian ice hockey player.
Wilhelm Harster, 87, German policeman, SS officer and war criminal during World War ||.
Mahmood Hussain, 59, Pakistani cricket player, diabetes.
Gotlib Roninson, 75, Soviet actor.
Wilbur Snyder, 62, American gridiron football player.
Richard G. Stilwell, 74, United States Army general.

26
Prince Gorm of Denmark, 72, Danish prince.
Gustav Neidlinger, 81, German bass-baritone.
Tom Neumeier, 70, Dutch rower and Olympian.
Sid Wayne, 69, American songwriter, lyricist and composer.

27
Cary Cox, 73, American gridiron football player.
Hervé Guibert, 36, French writer and photographer, AIDS.
Eitan Livni, 72, Israeli revisionist zionist activist and politician.
Petro Marko, 78, Albanian writer.

28
Jacques Aubuchon, 67, American actor, heart failure.
Cassandra Harris, 43, Australian actress (For Your Eyes Only), ovarian cancer.
Enrique Herrera, 87, Cuban film actor.
Cy Kasper, 96, American football player and coach.
Leon Punch, 63, Australian politician.
Alfred Dudley Ward, 86, British Army general.

29
Dora Gordine, 96, Estonian-British sculptor.
V. N. Reddy, 77, Indian cinematographer and director.
Brian Reilly, 90, Irish chess master, writer and editor.
Tony Strobl, 76, American comic artist and animator (Pinocchio).
Alex Tremulis, 77, American automotive designer.

30
Jean Grumellon, 68, French football player.
Louis Henry, 80, French historian.
José Miguel Marín, 47, Argentine football player and coach, heart attack.
Michiko Nakanishi, 78, Japanese sprinter.
Marcus Morton Rhoades, 88, American cytogeneticist.
Piet Vermeylen, 87, Belgian lawyer and politician.

31
Yuri Belov, 61, Soviet and Russian film and theatre actor.
Felicja Blumental, 83, Polish pianist.
Marco Antonio Serna Díaz, 55, Colombian herpetologist, ornithologist, and naturalist.
Mary Virginia Gaver, 85, American librarian.
Raymond R. Guest, 84, American businessman and thoroughbred race horse owner, pneumonia.
Laurdine "Pat" Patrick, 62, American jazz musician, leukemia.
Georges Poulet, 89, Belgian literary critic.
Ken Robinson, 64, Canadian lawyer and politician.
Christopher Steel, 53, British composer.

References 

1991-12
 12